Hans Peter Helander (born December 4, 1951) is a Swedish former professional hockey player who played seven games for the Los Angeles Kings in the National Hockey League.

Career
Peter Helander began his career as an ice hockey player at Rönnskärs IF, from 1971 to 1974 he was active in the second division 2. Subsequently, he played for eight years for the Skellefteå AIK - first for a year in Division 1 and from the 1975/76 season in the newly founded Elitserien. With the Skellefteå AIK he won the Swedish championship in the 1977/78 season. In the years 1981 and 1982 he was elected to the Swedish World All Star team. In the NHL Entry Draft 1982 he was in the eighth round as a total of 153. He was selected by the Los Angeles Kings for the 1982/83 season in the National Hockey League in seven games. In parallel, he played for the team of the Kings, the New Haven Nighthawks, in the American Hockey League, scoring one goal in nine games and three assists. He then ended his career at the age of 31.

International
For Sweden, Helander participated in the World Championship in 1981 and 1982. In addition, he played for his  country at the Canada Cup in 1981. His biggest success with the national team was the silver medal at the 1981 World Cup.

Statistics

At the International level

Achievements and awards
 1978 Swedish champion with the Skellefteå AIK
 1981 silver medal at the World Championship
 1981 Swedish World All-Star Team
 1982 Swedish World All-Star Team

External links

1951 births
Living people
Los Angeles Kings draft picks
Los Angeles Kings players
Ice hockey people from Stockholm
Swedish ice hockey defencemen